The 2017 World Para Athletics Championships were a Paralympic track and field meet organized by World Para Athletics, a subcommittee of the International Paralympic Committee. It was held at London Stadium in London from 14 to 23 July 2017. It was the 8th edition of the event, the first to be held after being renamed from IPC Athletics World Championship, and featured 213 medal events.

They preceded the 2017 IAAF World Championships also held in London, marking the first time that a single city hosted both the IAAF and IPC athletics championships in the same year; London previously hosted the 2012 Summer Olympics and Paralympics.

Events

Classification

All athletes are classified according to their impairment and compete against athletes with similar impairments. Each classification consists of a three character code, starting with a letter and followed by a two-digit number. The letter specifies the event type: T for track and jumping events, and F for throwing events. The first digit of the number specifies the type of impairment and the second digit the severity of the impairment; the lower the second number, the more impaired.

 T/F11–13 are for athletes with visual impairments. Athletes in class 11 and some athletes in class 12 compete with a sighted guide.
 T/F20 is for athletes with intellectual impairments.
 T/F31–38 are for athletes with coordination impairments (e.g. cerebral palsy). Athletes in classes 31–34 compete sitting or in wheelchairs, while athletes in classes 35–38 compete standing
 T/F40–41 are for athletes of short stature.
 T/F42–47 are for athletes with limb impairments (e.g. amputations).
 T/F51–58 are for athletes with impaired muscle power or range of motion (e.g. paraplegia). Athletes in these classes compete seated or in wheelchairs.

Several events are open to athletes with lower classifications, for example T47 events are open to athletes classified T45, T46 and T47. However, as with the 2015 championships and 2016 Summer Paralympics, no weighting will be given to a lower classified athletes in these events.

Participating nations
Below is the list of 1,074 athletes 92 countries who have agreed to participate in the Championships and the requested number of athlete places for each. Russia was found guilty of state-sponsored doping by the IPC in August 2016 and has been suspended from participating.

 (19)
 (4)
 (16)
 (37)
 (5)
 (2)
 (8)
 (5)
 (1)
 (25)
 (9)
 (24)
 (2)
 (5)
 (49)
 Chinese Taipei (3)
 (9)
 (2)
 (13)
 (6)
 (2)
 (22)
 (7)
 (10)
 (7)
 (1)
 (7)
 (23)
 (2)
 (23)
 (3)
 (50) (hosts)
 (27)
 (5)
 (7)
 (1)
 Independent Paralympic Athletes (2)
 (30)
 (10)
 (10)
 (20)
 (12)
 (9)
 (50)
 (3)
 (4)
 (19)
 (6)
 (12)
 (5)
 (4)
 (10)
 (1)
 (6)
 (2)
 (6)
 (21)
 (2)
 (3)
 (14)
 (5)
 (11)
 (6)
 (3)
 (3)
 (2)
 (5)
 (50)
 (18)
 (6)
 (5)
 (3)
 (1)
 (6)
 (3)
 (5)
 (2)
 (21)
 (30)
 (3)
 (12)
 (8)
 (15)
 (4)
 (16)
 (27)
 (1)
 (27)
 (16)
 (50)
 (7)
 (1)

Schedule
All dates are British Summer Time (UTC+1)

Source:

The results of the men's 800 m T54 race on Monday 17 July were nullified and the race rescheduled to Friday 21 July after three competitors crashed at the 600-metre mark.

Marketing

Mascot 
The mascots for the IAAF and IPC Championships were unveiled in April 2017, and chosen through a children's design contest organized by the BBC programme Blue Peter. The mascots represent "everyday" endangered species of the UK; the World Para Athletics Championships Championships mascot is an anthropomorphic bee named Whizbee.

Broadcasting 
Channel 4 served as domestic rightsholder. Sunset + Vine, who has previously produced Channel 4's Paralympics coverage, was named host broadcaster for the championships.

Medal table

Source:

Placing table

Source:

Individual medallists
The following athletes won three or more medals, with at least two being gold:

World Records 
Below is a list of all world records broken during the championships.

  Naas set a world record competing in the F41 men's javelin, though his throw left him in fifth place overall.

References

External links
 Official website
 Records broken
 Results Book

 
World Para Athletics Championships
World Para Athletics Championships
World Para Athletics Championships
International athletics competitions hosted by England
International sports competitions in London
2017 sports events in London
World Para Athletics Championships
July 2017 sports events in the United Kingdom